Stacey Ann Donato is an American politician serving as a member of the Indiana Senate from the 18th district. She assumed office on September 11, 2019.

Education 
Donato studied accounting at the Ivy Tech Community College of Indiana.

Career 
Outside of politics, Donato has worked as an accountant and office manager for car dealerships. She was also a member of the Cass County Council, Indiana Farm Bureau, and Grissom Air Force Reserve Base Community Council, and other organizations. She was appointed to the Indiana Senate in September 2019, succeeding Randall Head.

References 

Living people
Republican Party Indiana state senators
People from Cass County, Indiana
Women state legislators in Indiana
Year of birth missing (living people)